Ernest Willis Gatewood (born October 15, 1890 - August 21, 1949) was a Negro leagues catcher, playing mostly for the Brooklyn Royal Giants and the Bacharach Giants.

He died in Asheville, North Carolina at the age of 58, and is buried at Violet Hill Cemetery in Asheville, NC.

References

External links
 and Baseball-Reference Black Baseball stats and Seamheads

Lincoln Giants players
Brooklyn Royal Giants players
Bacharach Giants players
Schenectady Mohawk Giants players
Baseball players from Washington, D.C.
1890 births
1949 deaths
20th-century African-American sportspeople